The 7.5 cm KwK 40 (7.5 cm Kampfwagenkanone 40) was a German 75 mm Second World War era vehicle-mounted gun, used as the primary armament of the German Panzer IV (F2 model onwards) medium tank and the Sturmgeschütz III (F model onwards)  and Sturmgeschütz IV tank destroyers/assault guns.

The design of the KwK 40 was adapted from the similar towed anti-tank gun, the 7.5 cm Pak 40. It replaced the short-barrel 7.5 cm KwK 37 a 24-calibre long close-support gun, providing a huge improvement in firepower for mid-war tank designs. It came in two versions, with L/43 and L/48 barrel lengths, the former used during 1942 and early 1943, and the latter after that point. Along with the Pak 40, the KwK 40/StuK 40 was the most numerous anti-tank gun of the German army, and remained an effective weapon until the war's end.

History
When mounted on a casemate-armored assault gun-designated vehicle (Sturmpanzer) instead of a turreted tank, the weapon was called Sturmkanone 40 (StuK 40). Both the KwK 40 and StuK 40 were developed from the towed 7.5 cm Pak 40 anti-tank gun. The length of the ammunition used was shortened to allow for easier storage of said ammunition in vehicles the KwK 40 and StuK 40 would be mounted on.

The KwK 40 L/43 was mounted on the Panzer IV from April 1942 until June 1943. All 225 vehicles of the Panzer IV F2 mounted the L/43 with a ball shaped muzzle brake. About a 1,000 out of the 1,687 vehicles of the Panzer IV Ausf. G mounted the L/43 with a double baffle muzzle brake. The StuG III with the L/43 gun was designated as Ausf. F. of which only 120 were equipped with the L/43 (the remaining 246 having the longer L/48 version). All StuG III production runs through Ausf. F/8 to G mounted the longer L/48. The 780 original Jagdpanzer IV tank destroyers mounted the Pak 39 variant of the L/48 gun, the later Panzer IV/70 mounted the even longer Panther-derived StuK 42 L/70.

The L/48 was 334 mm (13.1 inches) longer and slightly more powerful than the L/43. L/48 became the standard gun from June 1942 until the end of World War II. The gun was fitted with an electric firing mechanism and the breech operated semi-automatically. Only one-piece ammunition was used.

Following number of vehicles mounted L/48 version from June 1942-April 1945
Approximately 6,000 vehicles of Ausf. G, H, J out of 8,800 Panzer IV
7,720 vehicles of StuG III Ausf. G + 246 of Ausf.F + 250 vehicles of StuG III Ausf. F/8
All 1,139 vehicles of StuG IV
780 Jagdpanzer IV

As with the 7.5 cm Pak 40, the muzzle brake of the KwK 40 and StuK 40 went through a series of design changes.  Five types of muzzle brakes were used, gradually increasing the area of exposure to the blast. The designs progressed from tubular type double baffle muzzle brakes to single baffle ball shape muzzle brakes, which proved to be insufficient in reducing recoil, followed by a double flange type from May 1943.  The front flange and rear disk type was used from March 1944, followed finally by the double disc type.

Ammunition

KwK 40 used shell 75×495 mm R  
 Pzgr. Patr. 39 KwK 40 (Armour Piercing Capped Ballistic Cap (APCBC) High Explosive round)
Muzzle velocity: 
Projectile: Panzergranate 39 (Pzgr. 39)
Projectile weight: 
Explosive filler:  of RDX/wax
Fuze: BdZ 5103 or BdZ 5103* base fuze
Round weight: 
Cartridge case height: 
Propelling charge:  of Digl. R.P. G1
Primer: electric, model C/22 or C/22 St.
 Pzgr. Patr. 40 KwK 40 (Armour Piercing Composite Rigid)
Muzzle velocity: 
Projectile: Panzergranate 40
Projectile weight: 
Explosive filler: none
Fuze: none
Round weight: 
Cartridge case height: 495 mm
Propelling charge:  of Gu. R.P. 7,7
Primer: electric, model C/22 or C/22 St.
 Gr. Patr. 38 HL/B KwK 40 (High Explosive Anti-Tank)
Muzzle velocity: 
Projectile: Gr. 38 HL/B
Projectile weight: 
Explosive filler:   of RDX/wax
Fuze: A.Z. 38 St
Round weight: 
Cartridge case height: 495 mm
Propelling charge:  of Gu. Bl. P.-AO
Primer: electric, model C/22 or C/22 St.
 Gr. Patr. 38 HL/C KwK 40 (High Explosive Anti-Tank)
 7.5 cm Sprgr.Patr.34 KwK 40 (High Explosive) L/48
Muzzle velocity: 
Projectile: Sprgr. 34
Projectile weight: 
Explosive filler:  of amatol (2760 Kilojoules)
Fuze: kl. A.Z. 23 (0,15) umg. nose fuze
Round weight: 
Cartridge case height: 495 mm
Propelling charge:  of Gu. Bl. P.-AO
Primer: electric, model C/22 or C/22 St.

Penetration comparison

Usage of KwK or Pak/StuK variant

L/43
 Sd.Kfz.161/1 Panzerkampfwagen IV Ausf. F2/G
 Sd.Kfz.142/1 Sturmgeschütz III (StuG III) Ausf. F StuK 40

L/48
 Sd.Kfz.161/2 Panzerkampfwagen IV Ausf. G (Late production G's.)
 Sd.Kfz.161/2 Panzerkampfwagen IV Ausf. H/J
 Sd.Kfz.142/1 Sturmgeschütz III (StuG III) Ausf. F/8 and G StuK 40
 Sd.Kfz.162 Jagdpanzer IV Pak 39
 Sd.Kfz.167 Sturmgeschütz IV (StuG IV) StuK 40

See also

 Ordnance QF 75 mm 
 F-34 tank gun 
 75 mm Gun M2/M3/M6
 7.5 cm Pak 39

References

External links

World War II tank guns
Tank guns of Germany
World War II artillery of Germany
75 mm artillery
Tank guns
Weapons and ammunition introduced in 1942